Coleophora horatioella is a moth of the family Coleophoridae. It is found in Spain.

References

horatioella
Moths described in 1952
Moths of Europe